Macko is a surname. Notable people with the surname include:

Joe Macko (1928–2014), American baseball player and manager
Steve Macko (1954–1981), American baseball player, son of Joe
Viliam Macko (born 1981), Slovak footballer

See also
Mack (surname)

Slovak-language surnames